La abuelita ("The Granny") is a 1942 Mexican film. It stars Sara García and Pituka de Foronda.

Cast 
 Sara García - Doña Carmen
 Pituka de Foronda - Anita
 David Silva - Fernando
 Carlos Martínez Baena - Don Jesusito 
 Miguel Ángel Ferriz - Don Adrián
 Lucy Delgado - María
 Dolores Camarillo - Josefa, sirvienta

External links
 

1942 films
1940s Spanish-language films
Mexican black-and-white films
Mexican comedy-drama films
1942 comedy-drama films
Films directed by Raphael J. Sevilla
1940s Mexican films